Ramanthapur lies in the eastern part of the city of Hyderabad, located in the Indian state of Telangana. It lies between Uppal and Amberpet, on the road from Uppal to Kachiguda. The area has been drastically developed when compared to the early 1920s . The population has also sighted a raise with increase in construction of new residential buildings. It forms Ward No. 9 of Greater Hyderabad Municipal Corporation. Bandaru Srivani Venkatrao is the GHMC Corporator of Ramanthapur.

Institutions 
Institutions in the area include CFSL Hyderabad, Central Detective Training School, Government Homoeopathy college and Government Polytechnic college. Aurora pg college main campus. A DD Yadagiri TV studio is also located in Ramanthapur.

Transport 
Ramanthapur is located on the Warangal Highway. The Metro Rail approaches the Uppal ring road and the Rajiv Gandhi International Cricket Stadium, and a new station is being built near Nagole. Ramanthapur has three TSRTC bus stops.

References 

Neighbourhoods in Hyderabad, India
Municipal wards of Hyderabad, India